Narges Abyar (born 8 August 1970) is an Iranian film director, author and screenwriter, best known for directing Track 143, Breath, and When the Moon Was Full. The film Track 143 is adapted from Abyar's novel titled The Third Eye narrating the story of a woman and her son during the time of war. Her films sensitively picture the sufferings of women and children caused by the society, war or radicalism.

Narges Abyar graduated in Persian literature; she started writing books in 1997. So far, she has written more than thirty story and fiction books for children, young adults and adults.

Biography
Abyar graduated in Persian literature; she has written several story and fiction books for children, young adults and also adults.
She began her directing career with the film Objects in mirror are closer than they appear in 2005 and some short films and documentaries, most of them are about the Iran–Iraq War.

Although she has written four drama films, she has also made several short and feature-length documentaries since 2005, her first experience in fiction was “The Kind Dead-End”; the winner of the best short film of the Setayesh Festival and in several international festivals were also presented for the competition section.

Personal life
Abyar is the wife of producer Mohammad Hossein Ghasemi.

Filmography

Film

Home Video

Documentary 
The Kind Dead-End; (fiction-15min-2006)
The story of a believable story (fiction 2007)
One day after the 10th day  (winner of the best documentary of the Egyptian Ismaili Festival - Grand Prize of the Batoum Festival in Georgia - Cinematic Success Award for AZA Festival in Greece - Diploma of Honor from the Iguana Festival in Italy - The Best Documentary of the Ashura Image Contest and participating in the thirty-five World Festivals
The Day of the End  (Documentary 2008) (The Best Documentary of the Semi-Long  Film of Cinema Verite Festival- Best Documentary Award for Ashura Art Mourning Festival)
Mother of the City (documentary 2008) (Best Film Award and Best Semi-long script of Yazd Sacrificial Festival)
Ulcer, ( Nasur );(fiction 2009); (Best Short Film Festival of the Holy Defense Festival - The Best Film Festival for Three Decades of Presence - Attending the Plant Focus Festival of Greece and Dhaka, Bangladesh)
Shirpooshan,( documentary 2010 ); (nominee for Best Documentary Award for the Grand Ave Festival in Poland)

Books

Her famous novels as:
Mountain on the shoulder of the tree (Kooh rooye shaneh-haye Derakht) ;(Winner of the Best Sacred Defense 2004 novel)
A Boy with insatiable worms on his body (Pesar-e Kerm be Doosh & Khandagh-e balaa); Literary Prize of Isfahan & Selected Top Book Festival
Third Eye Nominated for the Best Sacred Defense 2006 Novel
The Legend of A Skinny Spring; Winner of the Nobel Prize of Salambacheha & Winner of the Literary Writers
It was neither a day nor night (na shab bood na rooz); Lady Cultural Literary Award
The Poems of a sky-clad fish; Selected in Top Book Festival
Story of Two Fives; Selected in Top Book Festival
The Agitated Existence of a prosperous

Awards

 Objects in Mirror (2013)

16th Shanghai International Film Festival (SIFF) Shanghai, China

30th Los Angeles Asian Pacific Film Festival (LAAPF) Los Angeles, California, United States

Heartlan Film Festival 2014, USA

Silver Akbuzat Film Festival, UFA RUSSIA 2014,(Winner of the Audience Award &the best Actress Award

Festival International de Films de Femmes de Créteil, France 2015 (Winner of the Best Film Prize)

 Track 143,2014

BUSAN F F S.KOREA October 2014

Hawaii FF USA 2014 October 2014

INT'L FF OF INDIA, GOA 2014  November 2014

SINGAPORE FF  December 2014

INT'L FF OF KERALA India December 2014

ASIA PACIFIC SCREEN AWARDS 2014

Winner of the jury special Award for the Actress from 1st REEL 7

SEDNY FF June 2015 Australia & AUDIENCE CHOICE AWARD WINNER

22nd Aichi Women FF September 2015 Japan

11th Kazan Muslim Cinema Film Festival . Sep.2015, Russia

8th International Film festival “ East-West” Orenburg. Sep.2015, Russia (winner of the Best Direction & Best Actress Award)

Golden Rooster & Hundred Flowers Film Festival, China Sep. 2015

International Film Festival in Volokolamsk Nov. 2015 Russia(Winner of the Jury's Special Award)

8th Jaipur Int’l Film Festival Jan.2016, India(Winner of the “Best Women Film “ Award)

14th Dhaka Int’l Film Festival .Jan. 2016, Bangladesh(Winner of the “Best Women Film “ Award)

Menar Sofia Film Festival Jan.2016. Hungry

II International Film Festival "Golden Tower"Ingushetia, Russia 2015(Winner of the Best Film Award)

Aichi Women Film Festival, Japan 2015,Hiroshima Peace Film Festival, Japan.

 Breath "Nafas" (2015)

Iran's representative in the 2018 Oscars

received the Simorgh Zarin, the best film in the national section of the thirty-fourth Fajr Film Festival

winner of the Crystal Simorgh Best Supporting Actress (Shabnam Moghadami) from the thirty-fourth year Fajr Film Festival

Get a Statue of Best Supporting Actress from the Celebration of Iran's Criticts and Writers Association

Getting the Best Female Actor (Pantea panaeha) Simorgh from the Fajr International Film Festival

Appreciation to Sayyeda Sare Nurmosavi, for the film “Breath” from the 14th Resistance Film Festival

the Special Jury Award for the best film on the subject of the Islamic Revolution, was awarded to Narges Abyar for the film “Breath” from the 14th Resistance Film Festival

the nominee for the Crystal Simorgh Best Design and Costume (Asghar Nejad Imani)

the nominee for the Statue of the Best Visual Effects (Farid Nazerfasihi)

the nominee for the Best Statue of Musical Instrument (Masoud Sekhavat Doust) and the Best Makeup (Mehrdad Mirkiani)

Participation in the 20th Tallinn Black Eyes Film Festival, Estonia, and getting the Best Director award

Participation in the 3rd Asia-Pacific Film Festival in e, Australia, and the Best Children's Film Award for the 10th Asia Pacific Film Award, Australia.

Attendance at the 15th Pune Film Festival, India

Attendance at the 8th Sofia Film Festival in Bulgaria

Attendance at the Iranian Film Festival, Edinburgh, Scotland

Attendance at the 27th Iranian Film Festival, Chicago, USA

Screening at the Polytechnic University of Milan

Screening at Massimo Turin, Italy

Attendance at the Twelfth Women's Film Festival in Vancouver, Canada, and getting the Best Actress Award at the First Iranian Film Festival in Wisconsin, USA

Screening at Inies hall Toronto

Attendance at the Twenty-eighth Iranian Film Festival at the University of UCLA, USA

Attendance at the 4th Cannes Film Festival in Cologne, Germany

Attendance at the 3rd Zurich Film Festival in Switzerland, and winning the Best  Film Prize of Audience

Screening at 2nd hall in Montreal's Park

Attendance at the Iranian Film Festival at the University of California In Irvine, Orange County, USA

Attending the 6th Australian Film Festival and Receiving Jury Awards

Attending the Arab and Islamic Film Festival in Tübingen, Germany

Attending the Twenty-fourth  Film Festival of Women wave, Taiwan

Screening at Kabul University's Iranian Studies Department, Afghanistan

Attending the 41st São Paulo Film Festival, Brazil

Attendance at the Third Asia Film Festival in Los Angeles, USA

Attending the 7th Iranian Film Festival in Australia

Attending the Twenty-fourth Minsk Film Festival, Belarus, winning the Best Director and Best Actor of Children and Youth (Sara Noor Mousavi)

Attending the Iranian Contemporary Cinema Festival: New Sounds, Yerevan, Armenia - Screening at the Cinema Club in Geneva, Switzerland

Attending the Forty-eighth India Film Festival in Goa The New Delhi-India Children's Smile Film Festival, India

Screening at the Burlington Performing Arts Center, Vermont, USA

Screening at the Iranian-American Center in Washington DC, USA

Attending  the 23rd Iranian Film Festival in Boston, USA

Attending the Festival "For Your Notice" at Mill valley, United States

invited to the 23rd Iranian Film Festival in Washington, DC, USA

Attending the 5th Orangabad Film Festival, India

Attending the 25th Iranian Film Festival at the Museum of Fine Arts in Houston, USA

Screening at Canadian Cinematics, Vancouver

Attending the Thirty Third Festival Santa Barbara's movie, America.

Attending The Iranian Film Festival at the Iranian Film Institute in Silverrass Pearls, USA

Attending the Thrissur Film Festival, India

Attendance at Princeton Garden Theater, USA

Attendance at the Twenty-fifth Titanic Film Festival in Budapest, Hungary.

When the Moon Was Full is a 2019 Iranian drama movie which written and directed by Narges Abyar. It narrates the real story of Abdolhamid Rigi's marriage. This movie produced by Mohammad Hossein Qassemi and won the Crystal Simorgh for the best film in 37th Fajr film festival. Also, the movie awarded Crystal Simorgh for Best Director Narges Abyar.

Winner of the Audience Award in the 23rd Tallinn Black Nights Film Festival , Estonia

Winner of The Grand Prize of the Jury, The Student Award and The Best Performance Award at the 2nd edition of the Carcassonne International Political Film Festival in France, 2019

See also
 Iranian women
 List of famous Persian women
 List of female film directors
 Women's cinema
 When the Moon Was Full

References

Iranian film directors
Iranian screenwriters
Persian-language film directors
Writers from Tehran
Iranian women film directors
Women screenwriters
1970 births
Living people
Iranian documentary filmmakers
Recipients of the Holy Defense Year Book Award
Women documentary filmmakers
Crystal Simorgh for Best Director winners